The Recording Angel is a sculpture located in Waupun, Wisconsin, United States. It was added to the National Register of Historic Places in 1974. A recording angel is assigned by God with the task of recording the events, actions, and prayers of each individual human.

History
The angel was sculpted by Lorado Taft. He was commissioned to create the sculpture by his friend, Clarence Shaler, in memory of his wife, Blanche.

References

1923 establishments in Wisconsin
1923 sculptures
Books in art
Bronze sculptures in Wisconsin
Monuments and memorials on the National Register of Historic Places in Wisconsin
National Register of Historic Places in Fond du Lac County, Wisconsin
Outdoor sculptures in Wisconsin
Sculptures by Lorado Taft
Sculptures of angels
Sculptures of women in Wisconsin
Statues in Wisconsin